Global Vision can refer to:

 Global Vision (UK), a British campaign group
 Global Vision (Canada)
 GlobalVision